XHBC-TDT is the Televisa Regional television station in Mexicali, Baja California, Mexico. The station can also be seen in the Yuma, Arizona / El Centro, California area.

Digital television

Digital channels
The station's digital channel is multiplexed:

Televisa was approved to add FOROtv to six stations, primarily regional outlets, in northern Mexico in January 2018.

History 
XEM-TV channel 3 signed on from Mexicali on October 2, 1957. It was owned by a joint venture between Telesistema Mexicano, predecessor to Televisa, XED-AM owner Carlos Blando Obregón, and other partners. While its first full day of programs was October 2, it put out a test transmission on September 15 consisting of the Mexican flag and Independence Day celebrations co-produced with XED, and it signed on October 1 carrying the five-hour-long government report of Governor Braulio Maldonado from the Bujazán movie theater, using a remote control unit borrowed from sister XETV channel 6 in Tijuana. XEM was the first television station in Mexicali and the second in the region, after KIVA channel 11 from Yuma.

The callsign was changed to XHBC-TV several years after the station's sign on.

In 2014, Televisa Mexicali was consolidated with the rest of the Televisa stations in Baja California, bringing it under closer management to XEWT-TDT in Tijuana and XHS-TV in Ensenada.

On March 26, 2015, all Mexicali television stations shut off their analog signals. XHBC-TDT remained on digital channel 47, initially mapped to channel 3 via PSIP.

On October 25, 2016, XHBC-TDT moved to virtual channel 4. Channel 3 had been nationally reserved for Imagen Televisión and its Mexicali transmitter, XHCTME-TDT.

Programming 
XHBC is Televisa's local independent for the Mexicali area. It carries local newscasts and locally produced programming.

Some of XHBC's resources and news reports are shared with sister stations XEWT and XHS; this is especially evident during the evening Las Noticias newscasts.

Like all Televisa local stations, its local programs are seen on the "Local News" and "Local View" channels of SKY México.

Newscasts 
Las Noticias Al Amanecer
Las Noticias 3 pm
Las Noticias 5 pm
Las Noticias 8:30 pm
Las Noticias 10:30 pm

References

External links
 Televisa Mexicali

Television channels and stations established in 1957
Televisa Regional
Las Estrellas transmitters
Canal 5 (Mexico) transmitters
Nueve (Mexican TV network) affiliates
Mass media in Mexicali